Gauri Jog is a Kathak dancer, Choreographer and research scholar from Chicago. She has been practicing Kathak dance  and considered as an exponent of Lucknow and Jaipur Gharana.  Her creations include Krishna Leela, Shakuntala, Jhansi Ki Rani, Kathak Yatra, East meets West, Fire - the Fiery Tale among others. She brings to life traditional "art of storytelling" through the technical elements in Kathak. She is very popular especially among  younger generation due to her unique approach to combine some Bollywood steps and Yoga into the Kathak while taking care not to cross the boundaries of tradition.  
Her experiments with combining Kathak with Flamenco, Bharatanatyam, Odissi, Mexican and American Ballet have won many accolades. Since 1999 Gauri  
Jog and her group  have performed more than 325 dance shows in North America and India.

Early life and background 
Gauri Jog was born in 1970 at Nagpur and received intense, disciplined and meticulous training from her Guru Madan Pande of Lucknow Gharana who emphasized rhythmic  
footwork and its permutations. She also studied Kathak dance from Lalita Hardas of Jaipur Gharana, known for the art of abhinaya. She also studied from Madhurita  
Sarang of Mumbai. She started dance training at 5 and gave her first performance when she was 7 years old. Gauri Jog obtained Bachelor of Science and  
Nutrition and Masters in Education from University of Nagpur. She has attended numerous workshops by eminent Kathak Gurus from India including Pandit Birju Maharaj. She practices combination of Lucknow and Jaipur Gharana of Kathak.

References

Official Website 
Gauri Jog

1970 births
Kathak exponents
Indian women choreographers
Indian choreographers
Indian dance teachers
Performers of Indian classical dance
Indian classical choreographers
Artists from Nagpur
Living people
Indian female classical dancers
Dancers from Maharashtra
Women artists from Maharashtra
20th-century Indian dancers
20th-century Indian women artists